Kevin Uzzell is an English pocket billiards player. During the 2006 Men's World 9-Ball Championship he survived the group stages and the round of 64, but was eliminated in the round of 32 by Pat Holtz.

References

English pool players
Living people
Year of birth missing (living people)
Place of birth missing (living people)